Sentai Studios is an American postproduction studio of Sentai Filmworks located in Houston, Texas owned by AMC Networks. It was founded as Industrial Smoke & Mirrors, the in-house studio of ADV Films. It was renamed ADV Studios in 2005 when it merged with ADV's secondary studio, the Austin-based Monster Island; and then in 2006, when ADV began offering its services to other companies, the studio was also called Amusement Park Media before it was sold off by A.D. Vision in 2008. It was then renamed Seraphim Digital and was renamed to its current name in 2014. 

The studio is best known for producing English-language dubs of Japanese anime series and live-action Japanese films released by ADV, Sentai, Switchblade Pictures, and Maiden Japan. Other notable clients include Warner Bros., Sony Pictures, Microsoft, PBS, and Toei Animation.

Production list

Anime

TV and OVA anime

 009-1 (ADV Films)
 Air (ADV Films)
 Akame ga Kill! (Sentai Filmworks)
 AKB0048 (Sentai Filmworks)
 Amagi Brilliant Park (Sentai Filmworks)
 Amnesia (Sentai Filmworks)
 Angel Beats! (Sentai Filmworks)
 Another (Sentai Filmworks)
 Babylon (Sentai Filmworks)
 Ballad of a Shinigami (Maiden Japan)
 Battle Girls: Time Paradox (Sentai Filmworks)
 Blade of the Immortal (Sentai Filmworks)
 Blade of the Phantom Master (ADV Films)
 Beyond the Boundary (Sentai Filmworks)
 Blue Drop (Sentai Filmworks)
 Bodacious Space Pirates (Sentai Filmworks)
 Broken Blade (Sentai Filmworks)
 Btooom! (Sentai Filmworks)
 Call of the Night (Sentai Filmworks)
 Campione! (Sentai Filmworks)
 Canaan (Sentai Filmworks)
 Chidori RSC (Sentai Filmworks)
 Chivalry of a Failed Knight (Sentai Filmworks)
 Clannad (Sentai Filmworks)
 Clannad After Story (Sentai Filmworks)
 Coicent (Sentai Filmworks)
 Demon King Daimao (Sentai Filmworks)
 Devil May Cry: The Animated Series (ADV Films)
 Diabolik Lovers (Sentai Filmworks)
 Dream Eater Merry (Sentai Filmworks)
 Dusk Maiden of Amnesia (Sentai Filmworks)
 Ef: A Fairy Tale of the Two. (Sentai Filmworks)
 Elfen Lied (OVA: Sentai Filmworks)
 Five Numbers! (Sentai Filmworks)
 Food Wars!: Shokugeki no Soma (Sentai Filmworks/Crunchyroll)
 From the New World (Sentai Filmworks)
 Galactic Armored Fleet Majestic Prince (Sentai Filmworks)
 Gatchaman (Sentai Filmworks)
 Gate (Sentai Filmworks)
 Ghost Hound (Sentai Filmworks)
 Girls und Panzer (Sentai Filmworks)
 Golgo 13 (Sentai Filmworks)
 Guin Saga (Sentai Filmworks)
 Haikyu!! (Sentai Filmworks)
 Hakkenden: Eight Dogs of the East (Sentai Filmworks)
 Hakuōki (Sentai Filmworks)
 Heaven's Memo Pad (Sentai Filmworks)
 Highschool of the Dead (Sentai Filmworks)
 Himouto! Umaru-chan (Sentai Filmworks)
 Horizon in the Middle of Nowhere (Sentai Filmworks)
 I'm Quitting Heroing (Sentai Filmworks) 
 ICE (Sentai Filmworks)
 Infinite Stratos (Sentai Filmworks)
 Innocent Venus (ADV Films)
 Intrigue in the Bakumatsu – Irohanihoheto (Sentai Filmworks)
 Inu x Boku SS (Sentai Filmworks)
 Iroduku: The World in Colors (Sentai Filmworks)
 Is It Wrong to Try to Pick Up Girls in a Dungeon? (Sentai Filmworks)
 Jing: King of Bandits - Seventh Heaven (ADV Films)
 Kamisama Dolls (Sentai Filmworks)
 Kandagawa Jet Girls (Sentai Filmworks)
 Kanon (ADV Films)
 Kiba (ADV Films/Upper Deck)
 Kids on the Slope (Sentai Filmworks)
 Kill Me Baby (Sentai Filmworks)
 Kokoro Connect (Sentai Filmworks)
 Kurau Phantom Memory (ADV Films)
 La storia della Arcana Famiglia (Sentai Filmworks)
 Land of the Lustrous (Sentai Filmworks)
 Legends of the Dark King (Sentai Filmworks)
 Little Busters! (Sentai Filmworks)
 Loups=Garous (Sentai Filmworks)
 Love, Chunibyo & Other Delusions! (Sentai Filmworks)
 MM! (Sentai Filmworks)
 Made in Abyss (Sentai Filmworks)
 Magikano (ADV Films)
 Majikoi (Sentai Filmworks)
 Maria Holic (Sentai Filmworks)
 Mayo Chiki (Sentai Filmworks)
 Medaka Box (Sentai Filmworks)
 Mitsuboshi Colors (Sentai Filmworks)
 Moonlight Mile (ADV Films)
 Mother of the Goddess' Dormitory (Sentai Filmworks)
 My Isekai Life (Sentai Filmworks)
 My Love Story!! (Sentai Filmworks)
 My Teen Romantic Comedy SNAFU (Sentai Filmworks)
 Mysterious Girlfriend X (Sentai Filmworks)
 Nakaimo - My Sister is Among Them! (Sentai Filmworks)
 Needless (Sentai Filmworks)
 Night Raid 1931 (Sentai Filmworks)
 No Game No Life (Sentai Filmworks)
 No. 6 (Sentai Filmworks)
 Nyan Koi! (Sentai Filmworks)
 Parasyte (Sentai Filmworks)
 Penguindrum (Sentai Filmworks)
 Phi Brain: Puzzle of God (Sentai Filmworks)
 Place to Place (Sentai Filmworks)
 Planzet (Sentai Filmworks)
 Princess Principal (Sentai Filmworks)
 Princess Resurrection (Sentai Filmworks)
 Problem Children are Coming from Another World, aren't they? (Sentai Filmworks)
 Project Blue Earth SOS (ADV Films)
 Pumpkin Scissors (ADV Films)
 Red Garden (ADV Films)
 Reincarnated as a Sword (Sentai Filmworks)
 Rurouni Kenshin - New Kyoto Arc (Sentai Filmworks)
 Saiyuki Gaiden (Sentai Filmworks)
 Saiyuki Reload: Zeroin (Sentai Filmworks)
 Samurai Girls (Sentai Filmworks)
 Say I Love You (Sentai Filmworks)
 Shattered Angels (ADV Films)
 Shenmue: The Animation (Crunchyroll/Warner Bros. Animation)
 Shining Hearts: Shiawase no Pan (Sentai Filmworks)
 Shikizakura (Sentai Filmworks)
 Sword Oratoria: Is It Wrong to Try to Pick Up Girls in a Dungeon? On the Side (Sentai Filmworks)
 S · A: Special A (Sentai Filmworks)
 Tamako Market (Sentai Filmworks)
 Tears to Tiara (Sentai Filmworks)
 Teasing Master Takagi-san (season 3; Sentai Filmworks)
 The Ambition of Oda Nobuna (Sentai Filmworks)
 The Book of Bantorra (Sentai Filmworks)
 The Demon Girl Next Door (Sentai Filmworks)
 The Pet Girl of Sakurasou (Sentai Filmworks)
 The Executioner and Her Way of Life (Sentai Filmworks)
 The Wallflower (ADV Films)
 The World God Only Knows (Sentai Filmworks)
 Tokyo Magnitude 8.0 (Maiden Japan)
 Tokyo Majin (ADV Films)
 Towa no Quon (Sentai Filmworks)
 Tsuritama (Sentai Filmworks)
 Tsurune (Sentai Filmworks)
 UFO Ultramaiden Valkyrie (seasons 3-4; ADV Films)
 Un-Go (Sentai Filmworks)
 Upotte!! (Sentai Filmworks)
 Venus Versus Virus (ADV Films)
 Vermeil in Gold (Sentai Filmworks)
 Voices of a Distant Star (ADV Films)
 Welcome to the N.H.K. (ADV Films)
 Xam'd: Lost Memories (Sentai Filmworks)
 Xenosaga: The Animation (ADV Films)
 Ya Boy Kongming! (Sentai Filmworks)

Feature films

 5 Centimeters Per Second (ADV Films)
 Appleseed (Sentai Filmworks)
 Appleseed Ex Machina (Warner Bros.)
 Appleseed Alpha (Sony Pictures)
 Children Who Chase Lost Voices (Sentai Filmworks)
 Clannad (Sentai Filmworks)
 Colorful (Sentai Filmworks)
 Galactic Armored Fleet Majestic Prince: Genetic Awakening (Sentai Filmworks)
 Gintama: The Movie (Sentai Filmworks)
 Girls und Panzer das Finale (Sentai Filmworks)
 Girls und Panzer der Film (Sentai Filmworks)
 Grave of the Fireflies (Sentai Filmworks)
 Halo Legends (Warner Bros.)
 Is It Wrong to Try to Pick Up Girls in a Dungeon?: Arrow of the Orion (Sentai Filmworks)
 Made in Abyss#Made in Abyss: Dawn of the Deep Soul (Sentai Filmworks)
 Made in Abyss#Made in Abyss: Journey's Dawn (Sentai Filmworks)
 Made in Abyss#Made in Abyss: Wandering Twilight (Sentai Filmworks)
 Mardock Scramble (Sentai Filmworks)
 No Game No Life: Zero (Sentai Filmworks)
 Princess Principal: Crown Handler (Sentai Filmworks)
 Space Pirate Captain Harlock (Toei Animation/Ketchup Entertainment)
 Starship Troopers: Invasion (Sony Pictures Home Entertainment)
 The Garden of Words (Sentai Filmworks)

Live-action dubbing

 A Fist Full of Fuku (Switchblade Pictures)
 Big Bad Mama-san (Switchblade Pictures)
 Ghost Train (ADV Films)
 Synesthesia (ADV Films)
 The Kunoichi: Ninja Girl (Sentai Filmworks)

Notable personnel

Bryn Apprill
Christopher Ayres
Greg Ayres
Tia Ballard
Clint Bickham
Jessica Calvello
Shelly Calene-Black
Luci Christian
Amber Lee Connors
Patricia Duran
Maggie Flecknoe
Caitlynn French
Adam Gibbs
Matt Greenfield
Tiffany Grant
Hilary Haag
Brittney Karbowski
Christina Kelly
Krystal LaPorte
Brittany Lauda
John Ledford
Courtney Lomelo
Cindy Lou-Parker
Margaret McDonald
Carli Mosier
Emily Neves
Shannon Reed
Monica Rial
Natalie Rial
Jad Saxton
Molly Searcy
Juliet Simmons
Melody Spade
Allison Sumrall
John Swasey
Olivia Swasey
Alexis Tipton
Kira Vincent-Davis
Sarah Wiedenheft

See also

Bang Zoom! Entertainment, a dubbing company located in Burbank producing some Sentai-licensed series
History of anime in the United States

References

External links
 Seraphim Digital Website (via Wayback Machine)
 
 
 
 
 
 

1995 establishments in Texas
Anime companies
Companies based in Houston
Companies established in 1995
Dubbing studios
Recording studios in the United States
Video production companies